Stefano Kunchev (born 20 April 1991) is a Bulgarian footballer who plays as a goalkeeper for Sportist Svoge.

Career
His first club was FC Vekta. Kunchev made his debut in professional football as a 17-year-old for Lokomotiv Plovdiv. He signed with Levski Sofia in 2014, but was released after making only a few appearances for the team following a goalkeeping mistake made in a match against Beroe. He subsequently relocated to Greece.

Kunchev played for Lokomotiv Gorna Oryahovitsa one season but left the club in June 2017. On 11 August 2017, he joined Vihren Sandanski.

International career
In January, 2010, the Bulgarian national under-21 coach Mihail Madanski called Kunchev in the Bulgaria national under-21 football team for the friendly tournament Albena Cup.

References

External links
  Lokomotiv Plovdiv profile
 Profile at LevskiSofia.info

1991 births
Living people
People from Troyan
Bulgarian footballers
Bulgaria under-21 international footballers
First Professional Football League (Bulgaria) players
Association football goalkeepers
PFC Lokomotiv Plovdiv players
PFC Lokomotiv Mezdra players
PFC Slavia Sofia players
PFC Chernomorets Burgas players
PFC Levski Sofia players
Trikala F.C. players
FC Lokomotiv Gorna Oryahovitsa players
OFC Vihren Sandanski players
PFC Dobrudzha Dobrich players
FC Oborishte players
FC Sportist Svoge players
Bulgarian expatriate footballers
Bulgarian expatriate sportspeople in Greece
Expatriate footballers in Greece
Bulgarian expatriate sportspeople in Norway
Expatriate footballers in Norway
Expatriate footballers in Lithuania